The Albany Empire was a professional arena football team based in Albany, New York, that began play in the Arena Football League (AFL) in 2018.  Home games were played at Times Union Center located in downtown Albany.

The Empire was Albany's third arena football team and second AFL team; it succeeded the original Albany Firebirds who began AFL play in 1990 and enjoyed great success, most notably winning ArenaBowl XIII, before moving to Indianapolis following the 2000 season, and later the Albany Conquest who played in the af2 developmental league from 2002 until that league folded after the 2009 season (and was known as the Firebirds for that last season).

History
After the American Hockey League's Albany Devils relocated to Binghamton, NY, the Times Union Center was left without a full-time professional tenant. (It remained home to the Siena College men's basketball team of the NCAA Division I Metro Atlantic Athletic Conference.) On March 14, 2017, Center general manager Bob Belber confirmed that it was in early discussions to bring an AFL team back to Albany.

On October 24, the new Albany team was officially announced as a member of the AFL for the 2018 season.  The local ownership group (led by George Randolph Hearst III) has partnered with that of their AFL leaguemates the Philadelphia Soul (which includes Ron Jaworski, Dick Vermeil, Marques Colston and Jahri Evans among others) to run both teams' business operations while keeping their football operations separate. (This marks the second time that the AFL has announced two teams with common ownership and management but separate football operations, as the Washington Valor and Baltimore Brigade are both owned and operated by D.C.-area businessman Ted Leonsis but are competitors on the field and separately coached.) On November 7, Rob Keefe was named the Albany team's head coach. On November 9, the Albany team announced that the four team name finalists were the Empire, Fire, Machine and Phoenix. Voting ended on November 15 and the winning name was announced on January 23, 2018, as the Albany Empire.

The team played its first game on April 14, 2018, losing at home to the Philadelphia Soul 56–35 before a sellout crowd of 13,648. On August 11, 2019, the Empire won their first ArenaBowl, defeating the Philadelphia Soul 45–27.

After the 2019 season, the AFL announced it was ceasing operating teams in local markets and looking into becoming a traveling league. However, the entire league filed for bankruptcy in November 2019 and ceased operations.

Season-by-season results

Players

Individual awards

Personnel

Head coaches

Staff

References

External links
 Official website

 
2017 establishments in New York (state)
2019 disestablishments in New York (state)